Yurii-Bohdan Romanovych Shukhevych (28 March 1933 – 22 November 2022) was a Ukrainian far-right politician. A member of the Ukrainian Helsinki Group, he was a political prisoner and the son of Roman Shukhevych. He was a long-serving leader of the Ukrainian National Assembly – Ukrainian National Self Defence. Shukhevych spent over 30 years in the Soviet prisons and concentration camps. In the 2014 Ukrainian parliamentary election Shukhevych was elected into the Ukrainian parliament for Radical Party.

Early life
Yurii Shukhevych was born on 28 March 1933, in the town of Ohladów, Lwów Voivodeship, Poland (now Lviv Oblast of Ukraine). He is the son of Roman Shukhevych, a commander of the Ukrainian Insurgent Army. In 1944 when the West Ukraine was re-occupied by the Red Army, he was arrested with his mother and sent to Siberia. In 1946 Shukhevych was taken away from his mother to an orphanage for children of enemies of the people in Donets Basin. He ran away twice back home, but later was taken back again.

Arrested when he was 15 years old, Shukhevych was accused of being a member of the OUN-UPA, the nationalist underground organization that his father commanded. After he turned 16, in 1949, he was sentenced to 10 years in the Vladimir Central Prison. When his father was killed in action, in 1950, Yuri, now aged 17, was taken from Vladimir prison to Lviv to identify the corpse. He was released under an amnesty in 1954, after the death of Joseph Stalin, but the USSR Procurator General ordered that he be sent back to prison to complete his sentence. On the day of his release, in 1958, he was rearrested, charged with having conducted "anti-soviet agitation" in prison, and sentenced to another ten years, in a labor camp in Mordovia. 

After his release in August 1968, he was forbidden to live in Ukraine. He settled in Nalchik, in the North Caucasus, married, had two children, worked as an electrician, and wrote an account of his 20 years in prison. In February 1972, he was arrested in Nalchik after anti-soviet literature was discovered during a police raid on his rooms and handed over to the KGB in Kyiv, then sent back to Nalchik, and sentenced to another nine years in labor camps, followed by five in exile. In 1973, he wrote a letter to the UN from a labor camp in Mordovia, for which another year was added to his sentence. He was held in Vladimir Prison, then transferred to the Tatar prison.

During his time as a prisoner, Shukhevych went blind. 

After he had completed his prison sentence, in 1983, he was exiled to Siberia, and kept in a nursing home in Tomsk. He was allowed to return to his native Lviv in 1988, at the age of 55, after 44 years of absence.

Political career 
In December 1990 Shukhevych was elected as head of far-right paramilitary organization Ukrainian National Assembly which itself was renamed Ukrainian National Assembly – Ukrainian National Self Defence (UNA-UNSO) in September 1991.

Shukhevych failed to register as a candidate in the 1991 Ukrainian presidential election because of a failure to collect 100,000 signatures.

In the 1994 Ukrainian parliamentary election Shukhevych failed to win after receiving no more than 7.44% of the votes in single-member districts in Zolochiv.

In August 1994 Shukhevych retired from active political life because of health problems and relationships with other leaders of the party had finally deteriorated.

Early 2006 Shukhevych returned to politics and entered in the electoral list of the UNA-UNSO for the March 2006 Ukrainian parliamentary election at number 1. The party, however, lost the election and gained no more than 0.06% of the total votes. The party did not participate in the 2007 elections.

On 19 August 2006, Shukhevych was awarded the title Hero of Ukraine "for civil courage, long-term social, political and human rights activities in the name of independence of Ukraine".

In October 2006 UNA-UNSO re-elected Shukhevych as its chairman. And again did so in June 2010.

In February 2014 Shukhevych signed a petition that asked to respect the Russian language and Russian-speaking citizens of Ukraine lifestyle "so they do not feel like strangers in Ukraine".

In October 2014 Shukhevych was removed from his post as UNA-UNSO chairman due to the fact that he had agreed to run for the parliamentary elections for Radical Party of Oleh Liashko. In the 2014 Ukrainian parliamentary election Shukhevych as a candidate (placed 5th on the party list) of Radical Party was elected into the Ukrainian parliament.

In 2015 he was instrumental in the drafting and passing of the Ukrainian decommunization laws.

He died in Munich in the night of 21 to 22 November 2022, where he was undergoing medical treatment.

References

External links
Yurii Shukhevych
Lviv portal, July 6, 2007
Yurii Shukhevych escaped to father from special building. Krayina. 28 July 2012
Recollections of Yurii Shukhevych about himself and his father Roman Shukhevych: Part I and Part II in interview with Dmytro Gordon on pages of newspaper "Gordon Boulevard"

1933 births
2022 deaths
People from Lviv Oblast
People from Lwów Voivodeship
Ukrainian human rights activists
Recipients of the title of Hero of Ukraine
Recipients of the Order of State
Ukrainian fascists
Ukrainian nationalists
Ukrainian anti-communists
Eighth convocation members of the Verkhovna Rada
Radical Party of Oleh Liashko politicians
Ukrainian National Assembly – Ukrainian People's Self-Defence politicians
Soviet dissidents
Ukrainian dissidents
Soviet prisoners and detainees
Ukrainian Helsinki Group
Blind politicians
Ukrainian blind people
Ukrainian independence activists
Shukhevych family